In the Blood is a 1923 British silent sports drama film directed by Walter West and starring Victor McLaglen, Lilian Douglas and Cecil Morton York.

Cast
 Victor McLaglen as Tony Crabtree  
 Lilian Douglas as Marian  
 Cecil Morton York as Sir James Crabtree  
 Valia as Lady Crabtree  
 John Gliddon as Ralph Hardy  
 Arthur Walcott as Osman Shebe  
 George Foley as Flemming  
 Humberston Wright as Malcolm Jove  
 Judd Green as Stoney Isaac  
 Adeline Hayden Coffin as Dowager Lady Crabtree 
 Clifford McLaglen as The Kansas Cat 
 Kenneth McLaglen as The Whaler

References

Bibliography
 Low, Rachael. The History of the British Film 1918-1929. George Allen & Unwin, 1971.

External links
 

1923 films
1920s sports drama films
British sports drama films
British silent feature films
1920s English-language films
Films directed by Walter West
Films set in England
British boxing films
British black-and-white films
Films based on British novels
1923 drama films
1920s British films
Silent sports drama films